The 9th Annual Shorty Awards, honoring the best in social media, took place on April 23, 2017, at The Times Center, New York City. The ceremony was hosted by actor and comedian Tony Hale. There was a musical performance by Lizzo.

Influencer winners and nominees
Nominations were announced on January 17, 2017, with public voting closing on February 16, 2017. Finalists were announced on March 2, 2017. Winners are listed first and in boldface.

Arts & Entertainment

Content

Creative & Media

Team Internet

Tech & Innovation

References

External links
 Official Shorty Awards website

2017 awards in the United States
9
2017 in New York City
April 2017 events in the United States
2017 in Internet culture